Samir Houhou (born 7 September 1968) is a retired Algerian football striker and later manager.

References

1968 births
Living people
People from Constantine, Algeria
Algerian footballers
MO Constantine players
CR Belouizdad players
NA Hussein Dey players
CS Constantine players
CA Batna players
Association football forwards
Algerian Ligue Professionnelle 1 players
Algerian football managers
US Biskra managers
Algerian Ligue Professionnelle 1 managers
21st-century Algerian people